"Visions" is a song released in 1966 by Cliff Richard. The song spent 12 weeks on the UK's Record Retailer chart, peaking at No. 7, while reaching No. 1 in Israel, No. 1 in Malaysia, No. 1 in Singapore, No. 4 on the New Zealand Listener chart, and No. 9 on the Irish Singles Chart. The song was a hit in other nations as well.

Cliff would usually sing the chorus of the song, "When Will We Meet Again", at the end of his TV show It's Cliff Richard.

Track listing
 "Visions" – 3:01
 "What Would I Do (For the Love of a Girl)" – 2:29

Personnel
 Cliff Richard – vocals
Bernard Ebbinghouse Orchestra – orchestra and all instrumentation
Mike Sammes Singers – backing vocals

Chart performance

References

1966 songs
1966 singles
Cliff Richard songs
Columbia Records singles
Number-one singles in Israel
Number-one singles in Malaysia
Songs written by Paul Ferris (composer)